Dance: Re-mixes + Videos is a remix EP released by Antique.

Track listing
Hit Express Medley : "Kainourgia Agapi", "Opa Opa", "Follow Me", "Dynata Dynata", "Die For You"
 "Me Logia Ellinika" (Club Mix)
 "Westoriental Trip"
 "Kainourgia Agapi" (Video Clip)
 "Me Logia Ellinika" (Video Clip)

Greek-language albums
Antique (band) EPs
Antique (band) remix albums
2002 EPs
2002 remix albums
Remix EPs